Lofendazam is an organic molecule which is a benzodiazepine derivative. Lofendazam is a 1,5-benzodiazepine, with the nitrogen atoms located at positions 1 and 5 of the diazepine ring; therefore, lofendazam is most closely related to other 1,5-benzodiazepines such as clobazam.

Lofendazam as a human pharmaceutical has sedative and anxiolytic effects similar to those produced by other benzodiazepine derivatives. It is an active metabolite of another benzodiazepine, arfendazam.

See also
Benzodiazepine
Arfendazam
Clobazam

References

Benzodiazepines
Chloroarenes
GABAA receptor positive allosteric modulators
Lactams